Nobels gate is a light rail/tram station on the Oslo Tramway.

Located at Frogner, it was opened by Kristiania Elektriske Sporvei on 31 December 1894 as an extension of the Skøyen Line. It is served by line 13. Nobels gate was formerly succeeded by Olay Kyrres plass and Halvdan Svartes gate when going westbound towards Skoyen, but were merged together in 2006.

References

Oslo Tramway stations in Oslo
Railway stations opened in 1894